Harry Boyes (born 2 November 2001) is an English professional footballer who plays for Lincoln City on loan from Sheffield United, as a defender.

Career
Born in Barnsley, Boyes began his career with Manchester City and Sheffield United. He spent time on loan in non-league with Bradford (Park Avenue), and Solihull Moors, where he was in the National League team of the season.

He moved on loan to Forest Green Rovers in June 2022. Boyes spent the early part of the season injured. He was recalled by parent club Sheffield United on 2 January 2023 having played 16 times providing 3 assists in all competitions, and four days later he joined League One rival Lincoln City on loan for the remainder of the season. He made his debut a day later against Charlton Athletic on a 2-1 defeat.

Career statistics

References

2001 births
Living people
English footballers
Manchester City F.C. players
Sheffield United F.C. players
Bradford (Park Avenue) A.F.C. players
Solihull Moors F.C. players
Forest Green Rovers F.C. players
Lincoln City F.C. players
National League (English football) players
English Football League players
Association football defenders